Augustine Clarke (c.1780 – June 17, 1841) was a Vermont attorney, banker and politician who was a leader of the Anti-Masonic Party and served as Vermont State Treasurer.

Early life
Details of Clarke's birth are not known for certain. His name is sometimes spelled "Clark" and he appears to have been born in Richmond, Massachusetts in about 1780. He was baptized in Richmond on March 15, 1786.

Start of career
Clarke moved to Vermont and studied law, although the details of his relocation and studies are unknown. In addition, he was active as a merchant and in other business ventures; in 1815, he received a license permitting him to sell liquor and wine.

He was admitted to the bar in Wheelock in 1804. In 1806 he was appointed Wheelock's first Postmaster.

In 1806, Clarke was admitted to the bar in Danville. In 1808 he married Sophia Blanchard in Danville. Sophia Blanchard's sister Sarah was the wife of William A. Palmer, who served as Governor and United States Senator. Palmer and Clarke became leaders of Vermont's Anti-Masons.

Clarke practiced law in Danville. An adherent of the National Republican Party, he served in local offices including Justice of the Peace. In 1820 he served on the Vermont Council of Censors, the body which met every seven years to review statutes passed by the Vermont General Assembly and ensure their constitutionality.

In the 1820s, Clarke also became active in the American Tract Society. In addition, he was an active member of the American Anti-Slavery Society.

He served as Caledonia County Treasurer from 1822 to 1824, and Caledonia County Assistant Judge from 1824 to 1825.

In 1826, he was appointed president of the Caledonia National Bank, succeeding Palmer, who had been the bank's first president.

Clarke represented Danville in the Vermont House of Representatives in 1824, 1828, 1830, and 1832.

In 1830, Clarke was appointed one of Caledonia County's three Commissioners of Jail Delivery.

Clarke was named to the Committee to Erect the State House in 1832. He took part in planning and overseeing construction of the Second State House, which was in use from 1833 until it was destroyed by fire in 1856.

Clarke was one of the founders of the Anti-Masonic movement. William Wirt carried Vermont as the 1832 presidential candidate of the Anti-Masonic Party. Clarke was one of Vermont's electors, and cast his ballot for Wirt.

Later career
Benjamin Swan had served as Vermont's Treasurer beginning in 1800 and often ran unopposed or with only token opposition. In 1833, Clarke ran as an Anti-Mason and defeated Swan in the election for Treasurer. William A. Palmer had run successfully for Governor as an Anti-Mason in 1831, and Clarke's victory at the polls was considered additional evidence of the Anti-Masonic Party's viability in Vermont.

In September, 1837, Clarke was named to the Anti-Masonic Party's National Committee.

Clarke served as Treasurer until running unsuccessfully for reelection in October, 1837. That year Clarke had the highest number of votes, but at 47.3% fell short of the majority required by the Vermont Constitution. In cases where no candidate receives a majority, the Vermont General Assembly votes. By then the Anti-Masonic Party's popularity was on the wane and the nation was in the midst of the Panic of 1837, and Clarke did not win the legislative election.

By 1839, the Anti-Masonic Party had dissolved and Clarke joined the Democratic Party. In July, 1839, he was appointed United States Pension Agent for the State of Vermont.

Later life
Clarke's wife died in 1833. He subsequently moved to Montpelier. In 1839, his daughter Sophia married Samuel L. French, a merchant of Randolph, Vermont. In 1840, he married Julia Jewett Hubbard (d. 1881).

Death and burial
Clarke died in Montpelier on June 17, 1841, and was buried at Montpelier's Elm Street Cemetery.

Notes

References

External links
, retrieved January 5, 2014
Augustine Clarke at Political Graveyard

Date of birth unknown
1841 deaths
People from Richmond, Massachusetts
People from Caledonia County, Vermont
People from Danville, Vermont
People from Montpelier, Vermont
Vermont lawyers
Members of the Vermont House of Representatives
Vermont state court judges
State treasurers of Vermont
American bankers
Vermont postmasters
Vermont National Republicans
Anti-Masonic Party politicians from Vermont
Vermont Democrats
Burials in Vermont
American abolitionists
Year of birth uncertain
1780 births
19th-century American judges
19th-century American lawyers
19th-century American businesspeople